Ruth Kaplan (born 1955) is a Canadian photographer. Kaplan was born in Montreal, Quebec.

Kaplan is known for her long-term project Bathers, in which she photographed people bathing in public baths around the globe. Her work is included in the collections of the Ryerson Image Centre and the National Gallery of Canada.

References

1955 births
Living people
Artists from Montreal
21st-century Canadian women artists
21st-century Canadian photographers
20th-century Canadian women artists
20th-century Canadian photographers